Alight, formerly the American Refugee Committee (ARC), is an international nonprofit, nonsectarian organization that has provided humanitarian assistance and training to millions of beneficiaries over the last 40 years.

In 2011, Alight helped nearly 2.5 million people get essential services to regain their health and take back control of their lives. Alight works with its partners and constituencies to provide opportunities and expertise to communities of refugees and internally displaced persons in seven countries in Africa, Asia, and Europe, including Iraq, Kosovo, and in the Darfur region of Sudan and is currently providing for emergency relief and recovery in Haiti. Alight provides shelter, clean water and sanitation, health care, skills training, microcredit education, and protection to help survivors of war and natural disasters to rebuild their lives with dignity, health care, security, and self-sufficiency.

History
Moved by the plight of millions of men, women and children affected by the conflict in Southeast Asia, Chicago businessman Neal Ball founded the American Refugee Committee in 1979.

 One of ARC's first programs opened at Khao-I-Dang refugee camp in Thailand in late 1979. ARC also provided medical and public health services at Nong Samet Refugee Camp, Phanat Nikhom, Ban Vinai Refugee Camp and Site Two Refugee Camp until 1993, when the camps closed and ARC turned its attention to programs inside Cambodia. ARC later provided health, sanitation and laboratory services at Khao Phlu Refugee Camp from 1997 until 1999. ARC pioneered the treatment of tuberculosis in refugee-camp settings using an innovative program structure that other international agencies had argued was not feasible.

Alight became the organization's new name on June 21, 2019, after research found that persons who received aid preferred not to be identified as refugees forever.

Projects

Program areas

Agriculture & Food Security
Refugee and IDP Camp Management
Capacity building and Training
Community Development
Community Health Education
Community Reconciliation and Reintegration
Disaster Preparedness
Disease Prevention and Control
Emergency Health Care
Emergency Obstetrics
Gender-based violence Prevention and Response
HIV/AIDS Prevention and Treatment
Immunizations
Income Generation
Infectious Disease Prevention
Legal Assistance
Microenterprise Development
Microfinance
Maternal-Child Health Care
Primary Health Care
Protection of Vulnerable Groups
Psychosocial Support
Rapid Emergency Response
Refugee Return and Reintegration
Reproductive Health Care
Savings and Loans Associations
Shelter Construction and Rehabilitation
Small Business and Vocational Training
Sports and Recreation Programs
Through Our Eyes Participatory Video Communication
Water supply and Sanitation Services

Alight has humanitarian programs and provides medical care, shelter, protection services, clean water, community development support, microloans, and help for women who have suffered violence, as well as other opportunities to help refugees.

In 2010, Alight had programs in Africa in Liberia, and Sierra Leone. At some time, they also had programs in Sudan, Darfur, Uganda, Rwanda

In Asia, Alight programs are concentrated in Pakistan and in Thailand. In Pakistan, Alight has recently been working with to help civilians who have fled fighting between the government and the Taliban in northwest Pakistan. Alight also responded to the 2004 Indian Ocean Tsunami, providing relief services in Sri Lanka and Indonesia and a Fishing Boat Project in Thailand.

Haiti

On January 12, 2010, a 7.0-magnitude earthquake struck just outside Port-au-Prince. The capital city and surrounding towns were completely destroyed and a million people were left homeless. 50,000 were reported to have died. On January 14, the first Alight emergency response team members arrived in Port-au-Prince. They started planning the response, hiring local staff, and coordinating with the United Nations and other partners. In the following days and weeks additional staff with expertise in emergency response, logistics, health, water/sanitation, shelter, and protection arrived in Haiti. Alight distributed food to 2,200 people in the Delmas district of Port-au-Prince, 1,000 hygiene and kitchen kits in the Nazon district. On January 26, Alight began managing settlement of 5,000 people in Terrain Acra district of Port-au-Prince, working with multiple relief agencies. In the next few months the camp size grew to 25,000 people. Of the 19 most crowded settlements (of 300 total), Terrain Acra was the only one with an organization overseeing and coordinating relief activities.

Four cargo planes carrying 90,000 pounds of donated emergency medical and shelter supplies arrived in Port-au-Prince from Minneapolis. In Terraine Acra, Alight opened a health clinic, distributed shelter materials, built latrines and sanitation systems. On February 9, the first three child-friendly spaces opened in the Terraine Acra settlement. 300 children were expected and 1,000 showed up. On April 10, United Nations Deputy Secretary-General Asha-Rose Migiro visited Alight's camp in Terrain Acra . Alight is working with the local community and coordinating with international and local NGOs to help people survive and rebuild.

Côte d'Ivoire
The American Refugee Committee team has been responding to the refugee crisis on the border between Côte d'Ivoire and Liberia since December 2010, constructing shelters to house refugees in Nimba County, Liberia.

Kyrgyzstan
On Sunday June 20, 2010, Alight's Rapid Response Team arrived in Osh, Kyrgyzstan, to assess the situation and the needs of the affected communities.

Liberia
In the fall of 2003, Alight launched a program to assist those who had been displaced by the Second Liberian Civil War. Alight began providing services to people living in camps at Brown's Town and Unification Town and continues serving those locations today.

Pakistan

Afghan refugees
Today, there are millions of Afghan refugees living in refugee camps in Pakistan's Baluchistan Province. Some fled the oppression of the Taliban, others the Soviet invasion in the 1980s. For years they have known no way of life other than in the camps. Entire generations have grown up without the right to move about freely or the possibility to make a living for their families.

Alight provides primary health care to 98,000 Afghan refugees in the camps and in the surrounding communities. Alight also provides special attention to pregnant mothers and training for refugees in caring for their own communities. Alight helps refugees cope with the frustrations of living in a camp by organizing youth clubs and activities, working to prevent and respond to domestic violence in the camps, and building awareness of the threat of HIV/AIDS.

Earthquake relief
In October 2005, a massive earthquake shattered communities throughout mountainous northern Pakistan. The impact has been long-lasting, with entire families and villages wiped out and vital infrastructure destroyed. Within hours of the quake, Alight began getting survivors in Bagh District the emergency relief they needed – clean water, nutritious food, shelters for those left homeless and in need of emergency medical attention. Today, Alight's efforts are focused on working with communities to rebuild health care clinics and water systems in the region so that survivors can care for themselves.

2009 Pakistan displacement crisis
In the spring of 2009, three million people fled for their lives from fighting between Taliban forces and the Pakistani government in the mountainous region of northwestern Pakistan. Many fled to camps without clean water or enough to eat. But the vast majority have been taken in by local communities, packed in tight quarters – sometimes 50–60 people in very small homes. Water and sanitation systems were on the brink of collapse, and there was a serious threat of outbreaks of disease.

Alight quickly began trucking clean water into refugee camps and digging wells and latrines to ensure safe and sanitary living conditions. Aid workers have also stepped in at local clinics to provide comprehensive medical care and to try to reach as many survivors as possible.

Alight is also currently working to help Pakistani families who have begun returning. So far, 100,000 families have gone back to the Swat Valley. But the fighting destroyed infrastructure and other systems, leaving people without basics like clean water and sanitation. Alight will soon begin work digging wells and repairing infrastructure so that basic necessities will be waiting for families when they return home.

2010 floods

In late July 2010 monsoon rainfall caused flash floods swelling the river Swat and killing over 1,100 people. Alight's Emergency Response teams began work as the flooding subsided in early August, providing clean water and mobile health clinics for survivors. Alight's mobile health teams, especially water and sanitation teams, assembled and began coordinating with partners and authorities. Swat, Nowshera, Mardan, and Peshawar were the most severely affected areas. Roads were washed out, bridges gone, internet and telephone were functioning intermittently. Many affected communities remained inaccessible except by helicopter; others had been entirely obliterated.

Rwanda
Alight began work in Rwanda in December 1994, following the genocide. Alight manages all three major refugee camps in Rwanda, providing health care, water, construction, and sanitation services as well as programs combating gender-based violence and HIV/AIDS. Alight also manages successful income generation programs in the camps and hires and trains refugees wherever possible. In 2005, the government of Rwanda asked Alight to build a refugee camp at Nyabiheke to accommodate 5,000 new refugees from the Democratic Republic of the Congo. Alight quickly constructed roads, bridges, shelters, latrines, storage warehouses, and health centers, and began receiving refugees within a month of the request. The culminating achievement of the construction efforts was the drilling of a borehole to tap an aquifer, which provides 100,000 liters of naturally purified, filtered water per day. In the fall of 2007, Alight expanded Nyabiheke Camp to receive 2,000 more people fleeing increased violence.

Sudan

Darfur
The American Refugee Committee is taking a variety of actions to directly help millions of Darfuris who are without access to clean water, who are unable to make a living for their families, who live in camps with no access to farmland or who are forced to flee fighting too frequently to raise any crops.

Alight's corps of midwives assist pregnant mothers to safely deliver their babies, and health clinics provide treatment and medications to thousands of people each month. Alight is working with Darfuri communities to dig wells that will provide safe drinking water to thousands, and Alight is partnering with families to plant crops that will feed and support them. Alight provides tools and seeds and the families bring the farming skills to grow the food that will sustain them. In schools Alight provides children with nutritious meals. Parents have one less mouth to feed, and their children will be educated and better prepared to help rebuild the region when the fighting has ended.

Southern Sudan
Alight began operations in Kajo Keji County in Southern Sudan in 1994, providing health services to people displaced by the war. Operations have since grown dramatically, and Alight now operates an integrated program of health care, water and sanitation, and microenterprise development for war-affected residents and returning refugees. Since 2006, Alight has been implementing a major, long-term initiative to expand comprehensive reproductive health care services in Southern Sudan. Alight has recently initiated the Through Our Eyes project in southern Sudan, using hands-on video and community participation to get people talking about gender-based violence and how to prevent it. Alight currently works in Juba, Kajo Keji, Malakal, Nimule, and Yei.

Thailand
Alight's oldest program, Alight has operated continuously in Thailand since 1979. Currently Alight works in refugee camps along the Thai-Burmese border, providing health care services, health education, and water, sanitation and environmental health services to Karen refugees in camps on the border with Myanmar. Alight focuses on building the capacity and skills of constituents, training them to become health care providers and community leaders so they may apply these skills upon their return to Myanmar or their relocation to a third country.

Alight also operates in coastal villages between Phuket and Ranong in the south of Thailand.

Uganda
Alight has been working in Uganda off-and-on since 1994, when Alight began operations in neighboring Southern Sudan. Today, Alight manages 14 internally displaced persons camps in the northern Gulu District of Uganda.

Awards and distinctions

Alight was given an A+ rating by Charitywatch.org, a charity watchdog created by the American Institute of Philanthropy to rate non-profit organizations based on the ratio of funds spent on humanitarian aid compared to administrative overhead.

Charity Navigator gives Alight 4 stars, its highest rating.

Reader's Digest magazine, Money magazine, Worth magazine, and GiveSpot.com also highly rate Alight.

In 2012, Alight was awarded the Peter F. Drucker Award for Non-Profit Innovation.

Records
Records of Alight (and the American Refugee Committee) are available for research use.  They include domestic and international program records, organizational files, correspondence, subject files, publications, printed material, and newspaper clippings.

References

External links

Refugee aid organizations in the United States
International charities
Organizations based in Minneapolis
Charities based in Minnesota
Organizations established in 1979
1979 establishments in the United States